Getafe Cathedral (Spanish: Catedral de La Magdalena) is a Roman Catholic church located in Getafe, Spain. The edifice was a church for most of its existence, before becoming a cathedral in 1991 with the establishment of the Diocese of Getafe.

The church, designed by Alonso de Covarrubias and Juan Gómez de Mora, was begun in the 16th century and finished in 1770. The bell tower, dating to a pre-existing edifice from the mid-14th century, is in Mudéjar style, while the rest of it is predominantly Renaissance or Baroque.

References

Sources

Churches in the Community of Madrid
Getafe
18th-century Roman Catholic church buildings in Spain
Roman Catholic churches completed in 1770
Renaissance architecture in the Community of Madrid
Baroque architecture in the Community of Madrid
Bien de Interés Cultural landmarks in the Community of Madrid
Buildings and structures in Getafe